The Slang World Tour was a worldwide concert tour by English hard rock band Def Leppard in support of their album Slang, which was released in May 1996. Although Slang was the first Def Leppard album to feature new material with guitarist Vivian Campbell, this was his second tour with the band. Campbell joined Def Leppard just prior to their Adrenalize World Tour in 1992.

Musically, Slang was considered a radical departure from the band's signature sound of highly polished 1980s hard rock. Introspective songwriting, minimal studio production and Rick Allen's return to acoustic drums resulted in a more raw and organic sound. In a 2016 interview, Vivian Campbell reflected on the influence that 1990s grunge era bands such as Soundgarden had on the band's songwriting.

Concert production was also a radical departure from previous tours. The Slang World Tour introduced a completely revamped concert stage design. This was the first Def Leppard tour since the early 1980s to only employ "end stage" production design. Previous tours (Hysteria World Tour, Adrenalize World Tour) often employed "in the round" stage design. Rather than getting a 360-degree view of the band's performance with "in-the-round" staging, the "end stage" format created an atmosphere where all spectators faced the performance from one side. The new simplified configuration consisted of a rectangular stage with a wall of Marshall amplifiers positioned on each side of Rick Allen's drum kit. Also, in contrast to previous tours, the Slang World Tour featured a minimalist light show without laser effects.

Opening Acts

Tripping Daisy
Terrorvision

Touring personnel

Band:
Joe Elliott – Lead Vocals
Phil Collen – Lead & Rhythm Guitars, Backing Vocals
Vivian Campbell – Lead & Rhythm Guitars, Backing Vocals
Rick Savage – Bass, Backing Vocals
Rick Allen – Drums

Management:
Malvin Mortimer - Tour Manager
Jim Pendolino - Tour Accountant
Mark Spring - Production Manager
Butch Allen - Set/Lighting Designer
Brad Madix - FOH Engineer
Phil Wilkey - Monitor Engineer

Crew: 
David Sutherland - Stage Manager/Bass Technician 
Stan Schiller - Guitar Technician
David Wolff - Guitar Technician
Tony Moon - Drum Technician
Rich Locklin - Lighting Crew Chief
Jim Michaelis - Lighting Technician
Ken Zibrat - Lighting Technician
Michael Greene - Lighting Technician
Larry Vodopivek - Sound Crew Chief
Rudy Dearing - Sound Technician
Brad Judd - Sound Technician

Set list

Wings Stadium, Kalamazoo, Michigan (26 June 1996)
"Gift of Flesh"
"Another Hit and Run"
"Rock! Rock! (Till You Drop)"
"Foolin'"
"Animal"
"All I Want Is Everything"
"Have You Ever Needed Someone So Bad"
"Deliver Me"
"Hysteria"
"Work It Out"
"Slang"
"Bringin' On the Heartbreak"
"Switch 625"
"Two Steps Behind" (Acoustic)
"Photograph"
"Rocket"
"Armageddon It"
"Pour Some Sugar on Me"

Encore:
"Love Bites"
"Let's Get Rocked"
"Rock of Ages"

Tour dates

References

Def Leppard concert tours
1996 concert tours
1997 concert tours